The Báthory family were a Hungarian noble family of the Gutkeled clan.
Elizabeth Báthory, a Hungarian noblewoman and alleged murderer from the Báthory family

Bathory may also refer to:

Báthory (surname)
Bathory (band), an influential Swedish extreme metal band
Bathory (album), the band Bathory's debut album
Báthory (film), a film based on the life of Elizabeth Báthory

See also
Batory (disambiguation)